Elwood Vernon Jensen (January 13, 1920 – December 16, 2012) was the Distinguished University Professor, George and Elizabeth Wile Chair in Cancer Research at the University of Cincinnati College of Medicine's Vontz Center for Molecular Studies. In 2004 he received the Albert Lasker Award for Basic Medical Research for his research on estrogen receptors. He is considered the father of the field of hormone action.

Life 
Jensen was born in Fargo, North Dakota, in the United States, received his bachelor's degree from Wittenberg University in 1940 and PhD in organic chemistry from the University of Chicago in 1944.  From 1947 Jensen studied steroid hormones at Chicago, where he isolated estrogen receptors and discovered their importance in breast cancer.

Jensen worked closely with Nobel laureate Charles Huggins; he joined the research team at the Ben May Laboratory for Cancer (now the Ben May Department of Cancer Research) in 1951 and became director after Huggins retired. Jensen first described the estrogen receptor in 1958 and subsequently discovered the superfamily of nuclear hormone receptors along with a unifying mechanism that regulates embryonic development and diverse metabolic pathways.

He began work at the University of Cincinnati in 2002, and continued there until 2011.

He died aged 92 of pneumonia at Cincinnati in 2012.

Awards
 1963, Honorary DSc, Wittenberg College
 1974, member of the National Academy of Sciences
 1980, Golden Plate Award, American Academy of Achievement
 2002, Brinker International Award
 2004, Albert Lasker Award for Basic Medical Research
 2005, Honorary MD, University of Athens

References

External links
 Announcement that Jensen has received Lasker Award
 An Annual Reviews Conversations Interview with Elwood V. Jensen Annual Review of Physiology (2011)
 Youtube video of the interview with The Annual Review of Physiology, 2011.

1920 births
2012 deaths
American molecular biologists
People from Springfield, Ohio
Wittenberg University alumni
Members of the United States National Academy of Sciences
Deaths from pneumonia in Ohio
University of Cincinnati faculty
University of Chicago alumni
Recipients of the Albert Lasker Award for Basic Medical Research
American biologists